Dimitrios Karatziovalis (Greek: Δημήτρης Καρατζιοβαλής; born 22 July 1975) is a Greek footballer who plays for Makedonikos F.C. as a goalkeeper.

Career

Karatziovalis began his career playing for Propontida Neou Marmara where he first developed his skills. Then he played for Poseidonas Michanionas, Apollon Smyrni F.C., Ethnikos Olympiakos Volos F.C., Apollon Kalamarias F.C. and Aris Thessaloniki F.C., where he stayed for four years.

References

1975 births
Living people
Greek footballers
Association football goalkeepers
Apollon Smyrnis F.C. players
Olympiacos Volos F.C. players
Apollon Pontou FC players
Aris Thessaloniki F.C. players
Doxa Drama F.C. players